These are the Official Charts Company's UK Dance Chart number-one albums of 2009. The dates listed in the menus below represent the Saturday after the Sunday the chart was announced, as per the way the dates are given in chart publications such as the ones produced by Billboard, Guinness, and Virgin.

Chart history

See also
List of number-one albums of 2009 (UK)
List of UK Dance Singles Chart number ones of 2009
List of UK Independent Singles Chart number ones of 2009
List of UK Independent Singles Chart number ones of 2009
List of UK R&B Albums Chart number ones of 2009

References

External links
Dance Albums Chart at the Official Charts Company
UK Top 40 Dance Album Chart at BBC Radio 1

2009
Number-one dance albums
United Kingdom Dance Albums